In 1030, the first Norman foothold in the Mezzogiorno was created when Sergius IV of Naples gave the town and vicinity of Aversa as a county to Ranulf. The following are the counts of Aversa:

Rainulf I 1030–1045
Asclettin 1045 (nephew of prec.)
Rodulf Cappello 1045–1046 (appointee of the Prince of Salerno)
Rainulf II Trincanocte 1045–1048 (cousin of Asclettin)
Herman 1048–1049 (son)
Richard I 1049–1078 (cousin)

In 1058, Richard conquered the Principality of Capua and thereafter the counts of Aversa were, more importantly, princes of Capua.

References

Aversa
Aversa